James Norman Kerr (born July 23, 1939) is a former American football safety in the National Football League for the Washington Redskins.  He played college football at Penn State University and was drafted in the seventh round of the 1961 NFL Draft.  Kerr was also selected in the 19th round of the 1961 AFL Draft by the New York Titans.

1939 births
Living people
American football safeties
Players of American football from Pennsylvania
Penn State Nittany Lions football players
Washington Redskins players